Eric Dionne Rogers (born February 12, 1991) is a gridiron football wide receiver for the Toronto Argonauts of the Canadian Football League (CFL). He is a native of Glendora, California.  He played college football at Cal Lutheran and was a CFL All-Star in 2015. Rogers has also been a member of the Dallas Cowboys, Portland Thunder, Calgary Stampeders, and San Francisco 49ers.

College career
Rogers was a receiver at California Lutheran University, an NCAA Division III school, which plays in the Southern California Intercollegiate Athletic Conference (SCIAC).  He set school records for career receptions (220), receiving yards (3,461), receiving touchdowns (41) and total scoring (270). As a senior, Rogers set CLU records with 91 receptions and 18 touchdowns. The receiver also posted 1,298 yards that season. As the only athlete to receive All-America honors in two sports, football and track & field, Rogers is a member of the Cal Lutheran Hall of Fame. During his career, the team was part of four consecutive SCIAC championship and CLU never lost a league contest.

Professional career

Dallas Cowboys
On April 28, 2013, he signed with the Dallas Cowboys as an undrafted free agent.

Portland Thunder
Rogers was assigned to the Portland Thunder of the Arena Football League (AFL) in 2014, but was placed on the other league exempt list when he was signed by Ottawa Redblacks. After failing to make the Redblacks' roster, Rogers was activated by the Thunder. After 9 games, where Rogers posted 73 receptions, 903 receiving yards, and 27 touchdowns, the Thunder placed Rogers on the other league exempt list, this time as he signed with the Calgary Stampeders.

Calgary Stampeders
Rogers was signed by the Calgary Stampeders on July 7, 2014. He made a large impact in the West Division Final on November 23, 2014, catching 3 passes for 60 yards and scoring two touchdowns.  In 2015, Rogers' numbers were league-leading: "Rogers put up big numbers this past season for the Calgary Stampeders. He led the league with 1,448 receiving yards, was fourth with 87 receptions, and tied for the league lead with 10 receiving touchdowns."

San Francisco 49ers 
On January 20, 2016, Rogers signed with the San Francisco 49ers after visiting 16 different NFL teams. He tore his ACL in training camp and missed the entire 2016 season. On August 27, 2016, Rogers was placed on injured reserve. On May 2, 2017, Rogers was waived by the 49ers.

Calgary Stampeders (II) 

On June 6, 2018, Rogers decided to re-sign with his former team, the Calgary Stampeders. Rogers played in nine games for the Stamps in 2018, catching 36 passes for 499 yards with 5 touchdowns: He missed half the season with a knee injury. In the West-Division Final playoff game Rogers caught three touchdowns passes, helping the Stampeders to advance to their third consecutive Grey Cup match. Only 90 minutes before the start of free agency Rogers and the Stampeders announced they had agreed to a two-year contract extension on February 12, 2019. He played in 17 regular season games where he recorded 85 receptions for 1,080 yards and ten touchdowns and was named a CFL West All-Star. He did not play in 2020 due to the cancellation of the 2020 CFL season.

Toronto Argonauts
As a pending free agent entering the 2021 CFL season, Rogers' playing rights were traded to the Toronto Argonauts on January 31, 2021. Rogers and the Argos agreed to a contract the following day. He struggled with injuries in 2021, as he played in just six games, but had a productive six catches for 346 yards and three touchdowns. In the East Final, Rogers had six catches for 62 yards in the loss to the Hamilton Tiger-Cats.

References

External links
Toronto Argonauts bio
Cal Lutheran bio 
Dallas Cowboys bio
Calgary Stampeders bio

Players of American football from California
American football wide receivers
Canadian football wide receivers
1991 births
Living people
African-American players of American football
African-American players of Canadian football
People from Glendora, California
Sportspeople from Los Angeles County, California
Cal Lutheran Kingsmen football players
Calgary Stampeders players
Dallas Cowboys players
Ottawa Redblacks players
Portland Thunder players
San Francisco 49ers players
Toronto Argonauts players
21st-century African-American sportspeople